Gerry Blaine Mullins (born August 14, 1949) is a former American football player who played as a guard for nine seasons for the Pittsburgh Steelers of the National Football League (NFL). He played college football at University of Southern California.

High school and college
Gerry Blaine Mullins was raised in Anaheim, California where he began his football career at Fremont Junior High School, and was mentored at Anaheim High School by the head football coach Clare Van Hoorebeke (1950–1972).. After graduating, Mullins played for coach John McKay, at the University of Southern California along with O. J. Simpson.

Pittsburgh Steelers

Mullins mostly played right offensive guard for the Pittsburgh Steelers for his entire professional career (1971–1979), next to centers Ray Mansfield (1971–1975) and Mike Webster (1976–1979). Known as "Moon," Mullins was drafted in the fourth round of the 1971 NFL Draft and went on to win four Super Bowls with the Steelers (Super Bowls IX, X, XIII, and XIV). He can be remembered for a play in Super Bowl IX when he pulled on a sweep leaving an uncontested path for Franco Harris to trot in the end zone. Mullins also recovered an onside kick in Super Bowl X. Mullins retired after Super Bowl XIV.

Along with other players for the Steelers, Mullins also had a brief film career with a cameo appearance in The Rocky Bleier Story for MTM Enterprises.

Post-football
Mullins currently resides in Pittsburgh and is in the recycling business.

1949 births
Living people
Sportspeople from Fullerton, California
American football offensive linemen
USC Trojans football players
Pittsburgh Steelers players
Players of American football from California